Commiphora caudata, the hill mango or green commiphora, is the most abundant Asian species of Commiphora of flowering plants in the frankincense and myrrh family, Burseraceae. It can be found in Southern India and Sri Lanka, usually growing in the full sun on hilly granite rock outcrops in dry zone areas. It is a small to medium-sized deciduous tree which is said to be able to reach height of 10-20m, but usually is less high. The tree has a smooth, succulent green bark, which partly flakes off with age, giving rise to a characteristic patchwork of green and brown patches. Its sap has a strong resinous scent. The tree has medicinal properties. The fruit is a globose fleshy drupe with 2 to 6 valves and 1 seed that is black and has 4 wings. Remnants of branches can form a kind of thorns on the trunk. The flowers have a greenish to cream-yellow pedestal with pink to red petals.

Names 
English: Hill mango, green commiphora
Irula: Kiliya-maram
Kannada Konda-mavu
Sinhala: Seevaya
Tamil: Kiluvai, pachaikiluvai

References

India biodiversity

caudata
Medicinal plants